Pieter Bergman was a Swedish-born officer of the Imperial Russian Navy in 1698 - 1706,  cartographer.

He has created a drawing of the Russian ship of the line Goto Predestinatsia and several maps of the sea of Azov.

References 

Cartographers from the Russian Empire
Imperial Russian Navy personnel